Głos (lit. from Polish: Voice) is a Polish socio-political weekly magazine. Its editor in chief is Polish politician Antoni Macierewicz. It has a self-declared Catholic-nationalist bias (Głos: tygodnik katolicko-narodowy). It traces its tradition back to an underground opposition bibuła publication of anti-communist opposition from 1977 of that same name.

References

External links
Homepage

1977 establishments in Poland
Magazines established in 1977
Polish-language magazines
Political magazines published in Poland
Weekly magazines published in Poland